Goa, Daman and Diu was a union territory of the Republic of India established in 1961 following the annexation of Portuguese India, with Maj Gen K P Candeth as its first Military Governor. The Goa portion of the territory was granted full statehood within the Indian union on 30 May 1987, Daman and Diu remained a separate territory until December 2019, when it was merged with Dadra and Nagar Haveli and is today the territory of Dadra and Nagar Haveli and Daman and Diu.

The areas of Goa and Damaon are located at southern and northern edges of the Konkan region, geographically separated from each other by land and sea, the two areas were among the many other possessions that were ruled over for centuries, by the Portuguese in Goa and Bombay.

For the purposes of local administration, the territory was divided into three districts, Goa, Daman, and Dio district, with the capital in Panjim.

Lieutenant governors of Union territory of  Goa, Daman and Diu
Goa, along with Daman and Diu was a Union Territory of India until 30 May 1987. As such it had a lieutenant governor till that time.

Chief Ministers of Union territory of Goa, Daman and Diu

References

 
Former union territories of India
Portuguese India
History of Goa (1961–present)
20th century in Portuguese India
States and territories disestablished in 1987
History of Daman and Diu
States and territories established in 1961
1961 disestablishments in Portuguese India
1961 establishments in India
1987 disestablishments in India
Former states and territories of India
India–Portugal relations